Abu Ameenah Bilal Philips (born Dennis Bradley Philips; July 17, 1947) is a Canadian Islamic teacher, speaker, author, founder and chancellor of the International Open University, who lives in Qatar.

He has written, translated and commented on over 50 Islamic books and has appeared or presented on numerous national and satellite television channels, including Saudi TV, Sharjah TV, Ajman TV, Islam Channel, Huda TV, and Peace TV.

Biography

Early life
Philips was born in Kingston, Jamaica, to high school teachers Bradley Philips and Joyce McDermott. Philips has one brother and one sister, as well as an adopted brother. Philips was raised a Christian, with his mother being an Anglican and his father a Presbyterian.

Philips spent the first 11 years of childhood in Jamaica, before migrating to Toronto, Ontario, Canada. He attended Jarvis Collegiate Institute for junior high and Northview Heights Collegiate Institute for high school from 1962 to 1965. Philips moved with his family to Sabah, East Malaysia in 1964, as his parents were part of the Colombo Plan.

Education
Philips attended Simon Frasier University in Vancouver from 1967 to 1970, where he took biochemistry. Philips had encountered Islam several times in his travels, but the book that won him over was Islam, The Misunderstood Religion by Muhammad Qutb. He converted to Islam in February 1972, giving Shahada in the presence of Abdullah Hakim Quick.

He received his B.A. degree from the Islamic University of Madinah and his M.A. in ʿAqīdah (Islamic Theology) from the King Saud University in Riyadh, then to the University of Wales, St. David's University College (now University of Wales, Trinity Saint David).  There at the Lampeter Campus he completed his 1993 PhD thesis, Exorcism in Islam.

Preaching and career
Philips taught Islamic studies for a decade at Manarat al-Riyadh School in Riyadh and was an Arabic and Islamic studies teacher in the American University of Dubai for 10 years as well.  He also lectures at the Ajman University (AU) in the United Arab Emirates. Philips set up an Islamic Studies department of Preston University in Ajman in 2002 and set up the Islamic Studies Academy in Qatar in 2007.

During the First Gulf War, Philips organized Islamic religious revival meetings for U.S. troops stationed in Dammam, Saudi Arabia, during which (according to Philips) over three thousand soldiers converted to Islam. According to counter-extremism author J.M. Berger, some of the US military men and women who participated in his revival program were later recruited as volunteer trainers in the 1992-95 Bosnian War. Philips founded and taught at the Islamic Information Center in Dubai, under the Dar al Ber Society, and in Qatar he was an Islamic consultant and lecturer for the Islamic Information wing of Sheikh Eid Charity.

Islamic Online University
Philips founded the Islamic Online University in Qatar in the year of 2001.

Views 

Regarding his statement "Western culture, led by the United States, is the enemy of Islam," he has explained in an interview in Austrolabe that it was taken out of context, and that he was quoting Samuel P. Huntington’s famous statement on the clash of civilisations. When asked in an interview with author Berger about his statement in an earlier lecture that "he did believe in the `clash of civilizations,` and that America was the enemy of Islam"  he explains that he opposes the effort by "globalized western civilization" to "push ... secular democracy ... down the throats of the rest of the world."

Philips has stated that there is no such thing as rape in marriage in Islam:

[In] Islaam, a woman is obliged to give herself to her husband and he may not be charged with rape. Of course, if a woman is physically ill or exhausted, her husband should take her condition into consideration and not force himself upon her.

Phillips had previously stated in a lecture and in one of his books that suicide bombers are unfairly criticized as they are not really committing the suicide that is forbidden in Islam, but are showing bravery in committing a  military operation. However he would later state in a 2010 interview that he believes suicide bombings actually do not comply with Islamic law.

When you look at the mind of the suicide bomber, it's a different intention altogether ... The [enemy] is either too heavily armed, or they don't have the type of equipment that can deal with it, so the only other option they have is to try to get some people amongst them and then explode the charges that they have to try to destroy the equipment and to save the lives of their comrades. So this is not really considered to be suicide in the true sense. This is a military action and human lives are sacrificed in that military action. This is really the bottom line for it and that's how we should look at it.

Philips' ideas on suicide bombing made news after the website of Luton Islamic Centre, where a suicide bomber had worshipped, was found to carry a link to a lecture by Philips in which he made "comments used to justify suicide attacks, and material expounding antisemitism and homophobia".  The chairman of the Luton Islamic Centre has said Philips' comments that were posted on its website contained errors and that it should not have been categorized as "suicide bombings" because he was referring to military operations as opposed to harming innocent people.

In an interview in Austrolabe, republished in Muslim Matters, Philips calls himself a "moderate" and the claim that he is an extremist "baseless". He has also stated that he is opposed to Al-Qaeda and any type of terrorism in the name of Islam.

Controversies
Philips came under criticism in Britain for his statements on suicide bombers. Some civil rights advocates have defended Philips and criticized his deportation, claiming he is being religiously persecuted. Philips has responded to such criticism by stating he is a moderate who does not endorse terrorism or the use of suicide bombings in Islam.

Bannings
Philips has been banned from entering the United Kingdom, Australia, Denmark and Kenya, banned from re-entering Germany, ordered to leave Bangladesh, because of his extreme views and arrested in the Philippines for "inciting and recruiting people to conduct terrorist activities."

In 2007 he was banned from entering Australia on the advice of national security agencies.

In 2010 Philips was banned from entering the UK by home secretary Theresa May for holding "extremist views".

In April 2011, Philips was banned from re-entering Germany as persona non grata.

In 2012, Philips was banned from entering Kenya over possible terror links.

Philips was named by the US government as an unindicted co-conspirator in the 1993 World Trade Center bombing. He has stated that this allegation was not factual hence he was not arrested.

In 2014, the publisher of a book authored by Philips entitled "The Fundamentals of Tawheed" was arrested by armed officers during a raid of Islamic institutions in Prague. 20 people were detained during Friday Prayer at a mosque and a community center. Law enforcement officials claimed Philips' book "incites xenophobia and violence" and insisted it was racist.  Philips "vehemently" defended his book, denied it condoned racism, noting that millions of copies had been published in Muslim communities around the world, and stated that any action against the book could "constitute an attack on Islam itself."

In June 2014, the Bangladeshi intelligence service ordered Phillips, who had come to Dhaka to give lectures, to leave the country.

In September 2014, Philips was arrested in the Philippines for "inciting and recruiting people to conduct terrorist activities." He was expected to be deported by Philippine immigration authorities after police arrested him in southern Davao City. The director of the Philippine National Police in Southern Mindanao, said Philips is being questioned for his possible links with terror groups including the ISIS (Islamic State in Iraq and Syria). He was deported from the Philippines back to Canada. Philips denied the charges leveled by Filipino officials and denied links to terrorists groups. Some religious leaders and civil rights advocates have defended Philips and criticized his deportation from the Philippines, arguing that he has not done anything wrong and that he has been a victim of religious persecution.

In the April 2016 issue of Dabiq Magazine, The Islamic State of Iraq and the Levant, declared Philips to be a murtadd (or apostate)  and threatened to kill him for denouncing ISIS.

One of Philip's works entitled "The Fundamentals of Tauheed" has been described as "extremist" by the United Kingdom prison service. As a consequence, this book has now been removed and banned from prisons.

In May 2017, Philips was banned from entering Denmark for two years along with other preachers including Salman al-Ouda and Terry Jones.

Bibliography
 1985: The Mirage in Iran, Abul Qasim Publications
 1987: The Quran's Numerical Miracle: Hoax and Heresy, Abul Qasim Publications
 1988: The Ansar Cult in America, Tawheed Publications
 1989: Ibn Taymeeyah's Essay on The Jinn (Demons), International Islamic Publishing House (IIPH)
 1990: Islamic Studies Book 1, Al Hidaayah Publishing / IIPH
 1990: Polygamy in Islaam, IIPH
 1990: Salvation Through Repentance, IIPH
 1990: Tafseer Soorah al-Hujuraat, IIPH
 1990: The Evolution of Fiqh (Islamic Law & The Madh-habs), Tawheed Publications / IIPH
 1990: The Fundamentals of Tawheed (Islamic Monotheism), IIPH / Al Hidaayah Publishing
 1994: The True Religion of God, Dar Al Fatah
 1995: Arabic Reading and Writing Made Easy, Dar Al Fatah
 1995: Hajj and 'Umrah, IIPH
 1996: Dream Interpretation, Dar Al Fatah
 1996: Funeral Rites In Islam, Dar Al Fathah
 1996: Ibn al-Jawzee's, The Devil's Deception, Al Hidaayah Publishing
 1996: Islamic Rules on Menstruation & Post-Natal Bleeding, Dar Al Fatah / IIPH
 1996: Islamic Studies Book 2, Al Hidaayah Publishing / IIPH
 1996: The Best In Islam, Dar Al Fatah
 1996: The True Message of Jesus Christ, Dar Al Fatah / IIPH
 1997: Islamic Studies Book 3, Al Hidaayah Publishing / IIPH
 1997: Arabic Grammar Made Easy Book 1, Dar Al Fatah
 1997: The Exorcist Tradition in Islam, Dar Al Fatah / Al Hidaayah Publishing
 1997: The Purpose of Creation, Dar Al Fatah / IIPH
 1997: Usool at-Tafseer, Dar Al Fatah / IIPH
 2001: Did God Become Man?
 2001: Islamic Studies Book 4, Al Hidaayah Publishing / IIPH
 2002: A Commentary on Ibn Qudaamah's Radiance of Faith
 2003: A Commentary on The Book of Monotheism
 2003: The Clash of Civilizations: An Islamic View, Al Hidaayah Publishing
 2003: The Foundations of Islamic Studies
 2003: The Moral Foundations of Islamic Culture
 2003: Usool al-Hadeeth: The Methodology of Hadeeth Evaluation, IIPH
 2003: Usool al-Fiqh: The Methodology of Islamic Law Made Easy
 2008: A Commentary on Surah Al-Mulk, Al Hidaayah Publishing
 2008: A Commentary on Surah Al-Buruj, Al Hidaayah Publishing
 2011: A Commentary on Ibn Taymiyyah's Essay on the Heart, Dakwah Corner Bookstore
 2022: Tafsir Surah Ya-Seen, Dakwah Corner Bookstore

See also
List of Da'ees
List of Islamic studies scholars
Dawah
Islam in Canada
Zakir Naik
Muhammad bin Jamil Zeno
Yusuf Estes

source

External links 
 
 

21st-century imams
Atharis
Converts to Islam
Canadian Muslims
Black Canadian writers
Alumni of the University of Wales
King Saud University alumni
Islamic University of Madinah alumni
Living people
21st-century Muslim scholars of Islam
People deported from Australia
People deported from Germany
People deported from Kenya
Jamaican Muslims
Jamaican Salafis
1946 births
Islamic television preachers
Jamaican emigrants to Canada
Jamaican emigrants to Qatar
Canadian emigrants to Qatar